The MuchMusic Video Awards presented an annual award for Best Rap Video from 1990 to 2018. After 2002, the award was branded as MuchVibe Best Rap Video, for MuchMusic's urban music spinoff channel.

Winners and nominees

References

MuchMusic Video Awards